John Hanson Baker (1823 – December 8, 1894) was an American politician and preacher from Maryland. He served as a member of the Maryland House of Delegates, representing Harford County in 1858.

Early life
John Hanson Baker was born in 1823 in Aberdeen, Maryland.

Career
Baker served as a member of the Maryland House of Delegates, representing Harford County in 1858.

Baker moved to Baltimore around 1874. He was appointed to a position in the Baltimore customs house. He was a preacher at a Methodist Episcopal Church.

Personal life
Baker married Miss Ruff. Baker later married Cornelia Elizabeth Stockham. He had three sons, W. R., Thomas Stockham and S. V. His son Thomas Stockham was the president of Carnegie Mellon University. His nephew was congressman William Benjamin Baker.

Baker died on December 8, 1894, at the age of 71, at his home at 1202 Mount Royal Avenue in Baltimore. He was buried at Baker Cemetery in Aberdeen.

References

1823 births
1894 deaths
People from Aberdeen, Maryland
People from Baltimore
Members of the Maryland House of Delegates
Members of the Methodist Episcopal Church
19th-century American politicians